Tiki Tiki is a Canadian comedy film, directed by Gerald Potterton and released in 1971. Created by intercutting animated sequences with live-action footage from the Russian children's film Aybolit-66, the animated sequences tell the story of a group of monkeys who are working to produce a film, while the Aybolit-66 footage represents the film they are making. The film was inspired in part by Woody Allen's 1966 film What's Up, Tiger Lily?, which used original dialogue to recontextualize a foreign-language film.

The film's voice cast included Barry Baldaro, Gayle Claitman, Patrick Conlon, Peter Cullen, Jean Shepherd, Joan Stuart and Ted Zeigler.

During the film's promotion, Potterton acknowledged that it was a challenging film to market, as his production company wasn't sure whether to aim it at "kids or stoned teenagers or whatever", and has referred to the finished product as "a cross between a whacked out animated version of Easy Rider and the Olsen and Johnson musical Hellzapoppin'".

Alexander Kuznetsov, the production designer of Aybolit-66, was named the winner of the Canadian Film Award for Best Art Direction/Production Design at the 23rd Canadian Film Awards.

References

External links 
 

1971 animated films
1971 films
Canadian animated feature films
Canadian comedy films
Films directed by Gerald Potterton
1970s English-language films
1970s Canadian films